The Pierce Memorial Garden is an urban park in the town of Denbigh, in Denbighshire, Wales. It was constructed between 1874 and 1887 and commemorates Evan Pierce who donated the land. Pierce, a doctor, sat on Denbigh Town Council for 50 years and served five terms of office as mayor. The garden is registered Grade II on the Register of Parks and Gardens of Special Historic Interest in Wales. The statue depicting Pierce is listed at Grade II*. The park is managed by Denbighshire County Council.

History and description
Evan Pierce was born in Denbigh and trained as a doctor. He later worked as the County coroner for Denbighshire. He sat as an alderman on Denbigh town council for over 50 years and served as mayor on five occasions. While a medical student in Edinburgh, and subsequently in practice in his home town, Pierce gained considerable public recognition for his work in combatting the cholera pandemic. In recognition of this, and of his other works in the town, a public subscription was raised to construct a commemorative garden. Pierce himself donated the land for the garden in the early 1870s, the foundation stone was laid in 1872 and work continued for another decade, the column being completed in 1885. Pierce also funded the two fountains at the entrance to the garden, erected to commemorate the Golden Jubilee of Queen Victoria in 1887.

The gardens were restored in 2007 by Purcell Miller Triton.

The memorial set within the park is a column topped by a statue of Pierce. The statue was sculpted by W. and T. Wills, the column by Martin Underwood and the relief panels on the column are by Mario Raggi. The memorial is a Grade II* listed structure and the garden is listed Grade II on the Cadw/ICOMOS Register of Parks and Gardens of Special Historic Interest in Wales. The two fountains are listed at Grade II.

Gallery

Footnotes

References

Sources

External links
 Illustrated article on the garden

Denbigh
Registered historic parks and gardens in Denbighshire
Grade II* listed buildings in Denbighshire